The following is the qualification system for the 2023 Central American and Caribbean Games competition.

Qualification system 
The host country will automatically be qualified with the full team of eight (8) athletes, four (4) men and four (4) women. 

The remaining quotas (52) will be distributed according to the ranking position of the countries. The number of quotas assigned to each NOC will be informed and will be calculated based on the position in the World Ranking (WR) of December 27, 2022. The National Olympic Committees (NOCs) will be notified of the allocated quotas by January 3, 2023. The ranking by country will be calculated by the sum of the points reflected in the WR listings of the top ranked athletes or pairs in each World Ranking list (men's singles, women's singles, men's doubles, women's doubles and mixed doubles).

Qualification timeline

Qualification summary

Women's

Men's

References

P
Qualification for the 2023 Central American and Caribbean Games